(DS Rom) is a German international school in Rome, Italy. It serves levels kindergarten through gymnasium. It has currently about 900 pupils. The final exams are recognized in Germany, Austria and Italy.
The DS Rom is located in Rome Via Aurelia Antica 397 west of Villa Doria Pamphili. It has a swimming hall and numerous sport-facilities. In the afternoon a rich program of sports and music is offered, i.a. a number of choirs, orchesters and also lessons for solo-musicians.

Structure and lessons

The DS Rom offers classes from kindergarten up to a-level. It teaches in German, but some topics are taught in Italian to promote the bilingual character of the school.
In grade 3 the DSR teaches English, in grade 6 pupils can choose between Latin or French.

Organization and finance

The DS Rom is run by the "Deutsche Schulverein in Rom". The parents of the pupils are the members of the "Schulverein". The school is mainly financed by school-fees (about 5000 Euro per year per pupil). It is financially supported by Germany, which also contributes teachers from Germany.

See also
German international schools in Italy:
 Deutsche Schule Genua
 Deutsche Schule Mailand 
Italian international schools in Germany:
 Liceo Italo Svevo
 Papst-Johannes XXIII-Schule

References

Gerd Vesper: Die Deutsche Schule Rom: Konfessionalismus, Nationalismus, Internationale Begegnung, Husum 2011.

External links
 Hompege of the DSR
 Official Facebook
 DSR on Twitter

International schools in Rome
Rome
Secondary schools in Italy